'Athletic Syllogos Olympia Vatili or ASOB Vatili was a Cypriot football team. The team was established in Vatili, Famagusta in 1939. The Turkish invasion of Cyprus and the subsequent occupation of the Vatily left ASOB with no home, no financial resources, and no stadium. They team were reactive for some years in the free area of Cyprus. 

They were played 3 times in Cypriot Third Division.

References

Defunct football clubs in Cyprus
Association football clubs established in 1939